The 1948 Paris–Tours was the 42nd edition of the Paris–Tours cycle race and was held on 25 April 1948. The race started in Paris and finished in Tours. The race was won by Louis Caput.

General classification

References

1948 in French sport
1948
Paris–Tours
April 1948 sports events in Europe